Madison Street is a major east–west street in Chicago, Illinois. Prior to human intervention, the Chicago River emptied into Lake Michigan at the present day intersection of Madison Street and Michigan Avenue.

Per a 1908 decision by Chicago's city council, Madison serves as the north–south dividing line for Chicago's street numbering system, while State Street serves as the east–west line. At one point, the intersection between the two streets was considered the "world's busiest corner."

Notable buildings located along Madison Street include the Carson, Pirie, Scott and Company Building, Chase Tower, Three First National Plaza, the Chicago Civic Opera House, Citigroup Center and the United Center. The Chicago Stadium was situated across the street from the United Center until it was demolished in 1995.

Transportation
Madison Street was one of the "Big Five" streetcar lines of Chicago in the early-to-mid 20th century, which carried the most passengers, had the shortest intervals between cars, and had two-car trains in contrast to the typical one-car Chicago streetcar the most often. Madison Street was home to some of the earliest transit in Chicago, having a horse car service starting from 1859. Cable cars operated on the street until they were replaced by streetcars on August 19, 1906. This line was formally codified as Through Route 20 (TR 20) in July 1921. Two-car motor-trailer trains ran on Madison from October 14, 1923, to July 19, 1930; multiple-unit control trains began on an experimental basis on July 13, 1924. A branch line diverging from the main service on Fifth Avenue joined the main line downtown starting August 19, 1906, after having previously been a shuttle; staying a shuttle during the night, it reverted to that status on Sundays starting April 24, 1932. As of 1928, the main line had owl service between 1:01 and 5:20 a.m., during which cars ran for every ten minutes, but the Fifth Avenue branch did not, the last eastbound through-route car departing its western terminus of Crawford Avenue at 12:40 a.m. and the last westbound shuttle departing Madison at 2:00 a.m.; during the day, streetcar lines in Chicago typically had intervals of between eight and fifteen minutes. Buses replaced main line streetcars on weekends starting May 11, 1952simultaneous with the Fifth Avenue branch's replacement by buses on Saturdaysand altogether on December 13, 1953, whereupon the Fifth Avenue branch became a shuttle service at all times before it too was discontinued on February 22, 1954.

References

Works cited

Streets in Chicago
Articles containing video clips